The Open Payment Initiative, or O.P.I. for short, was launched to standardize the application interface between the EPOS application and any cashless payments solution installed on the EFT/PoS terminal. The specification for this interface focused mainly on international and cross-industry aspects. Today, the O.P.I. interface is already a de facto European standard, which is spreading from Germany to retailing projects throughout Europe.

The specifications, which were first published in 2003, and reference installations are based on the POS EPS specifications from IFSF (International Forecourt Standards Forum), which were developed for the service station industry and to which retail features have been added. The universal O.P.I. interface has made it possible to integrate varying EFT/PoS solutions in European POS projects for the first time.

Versions

Technical solution 
The O.P.I. interface implementation does not depend on a specific operating system.
It is an XML-based interface. Communication takes place via TCP/IP. The XML messages are exchanged over two sockets that are referred to as channels (channel 0 and channel 1). The original OPI/IFSF specification defines three message pairs:

Card Request/Response (channel 0)
Service Request/Response (channel 0)
Device Request/Response (channel 1)

Using the O.P.I. interface gives a payment solution access to the PoS peripherals, e.g. to a PoS printer to print out receipts, a display to output messages to the cashier or cardholder, or a magnetic card reader.
Decoupling the interface in this way increases its flexibility for integration in international, solution and industry-specific scenarios for users as well as for PoS and payment solution providers, and therefore also protects their investments.

International installations 
Since 2003, the O.P.I. interface has been deployed by various software and EFT/PoS solution providers in numerous projects in the Netherlands, Germany, France, Ireland, Austria, Portugal, Switzerland, UK and Denmark.

References 
 “Open Payment Initiative” in SOURCE Informationsdienst, Nr. 3, 15. March. 2003 / 10. Jahrg., S. 3
 „Fortschritte bei der Open Payment Initiative“ in SOURCE Informationsdienst, Nr. 2, 15. Febr. 2004 / 11. Jahrg., S. 6
 „Der rentable Inventurverlust“ in SICHERHEITSHALBER Zeitschrift für Sicherheit in der Supply Chain des Handels, 3 / 2004, ISSN 1612-4774, S. 17
 „OPI sorgt für Flexible Kassen“ in Lebensmittelzeitung, 16. April 2004, S. 30
 Horst Rüter: Kartengestützte Zahlungssysteme im Einzelhandel, Ergebnisse der Jahresuntersuchung 2004, Köln 2004, S. 12
 Jürgen Manske: „Open Payment Initiative - Länderübergreifender Schnittstellenstandard“ in retail technology journal, 3 / 2004, S. 19
 Horst Förster: „Kartenterminals – Die nächste Stufe“ in retail technology journal, 1 / 2005, S. 34f
 Cetin Acar, Ulrich Spaan: Kassensysteme 2006, Status Quo und Perspektiven, Köln 2006, S. 25f
 „Kartenzahlung bei Karstadt zukunftssicher“ in e:view, Ausgabe 1/06, 10. February 2006, ISSN 1862-1643, S. 8f

External links
 International Forecourt Standards Forum: http://www.ifsf.org

See also
EFTPOS
EPAS

Payment methods in retailing
Payment systems
Banking technology
Banking terms